The Walla Walla Valley Traction Company Car Barn, at 1102 W. Cherry in Walla Walla, Washington, was built in 1906.  It was listed on the National Register of Historic Places in 1989.

It has also been known as the Walla Walla Valley Traction Company Engine House.

It was originally Walla Walla's streetcar and train facility. Now it is the Canoe Ridge Vineyard's tasting room.

References

National Register of Historic Places in Walla Walla County, Washington
Buildings and structures completed in 1906
1906 establishments in Washington (state)